Jingo may refer to:
 Jingoism, aggressive nationalism
 Empress Jingū (also Jingū or Jingō), a legendary empress of Japan
 Jingo (novel), from the Discworld series
 "Jin-go-lo-ba" or "Jingo", a 1959 song by Babatunde Olatunji, covered by multiple artists
 Jingo, Kansas, a community in the United States
 Jingo, West Virginia, an unincorporated community in the United States
 Jingo, the main town on Rossel Island in Papua New Guinea
 "Jingo", fifth movement of Statements for orchestra by Aaron Copland
 By Jingo, a minced oath from the 17th century
"Oh By Jingo!", a 1919 popular song